= Brainworks Learning Systems =

- India

Information
- Type: Private
- Motto: Discovering the genius in your child
- Established: 2008; 18 years ago
- Chief Executive Officer: Nanette D'Sa
- Staff: 120
- Website: www.brainworks.co.in

Brainworks Kids Creative Learning was established in May 2008 by the Better Value brand. It started with 14 company-owned outlets in Western India when Brainworks launched its franchising drive in October 2008. It has a playschool, nursery, KG, daycare and hobby classes for children.

The Brainworks website has been inactive since 2018.

== Programmes ==
The Brainworks Learning Development Program (LDP) consists of the 'windows of opportunity' that maximize development through a scientific curriculum for preschool, structured learning daycare, and curriculum-based creative learning for hobby classes.

=== Curriculum ===
Brainworks has designed its curriculum and methodology based on scientific brain research studies. Brainworks preschools provide a research-driven teaching and learning environment for children between under 6 years old.

=== Facilities ===
Brainworks schools are located in residential areas. The average school size is about 1500 to 2,000 square feet (190 m^{2}). This area includes at least four classrooms, a play area, a pantry, storage spaces, and child-friendly washrooms. All washrooms are self-contained within the classroom or the school complex.

== Partnerships ==
Brainwork is an initiative of Popular Prakashan to reach a mass audience. The parent company Better Value Brands Pvt. Ltd. consists of group firms including Talwalkars, Popular Prakashan, Better Value Restaurants, Lateral Heights and Naturals Ice cream.
